Neumarkt (literally "new market";) is a comune (municipality) in South Tyrol in northern Italy, located about  south of the city of Bolzano.

Geography

Neumarkt borders the following municipalities: Kaltern, Kurtatsch, Kurtinig, Margreid, Montan, Salorno and Tramin.

Neumarkt is the chief town of the Überetsch-Unterland district. It is the main cultural, historical and artistic center with a very nice old town. The agglomeration includes the neighborhoods of Vill, Laag and Mazon. In the entire district Neumarkt is only the third most populated town after Laives and Eppan, which are agglomerated to the capital city Bolzano.

The town is situated on the plain, elevation , on the left side of the Adige river.

Neumarkt was a Roman village on the Claudia Augusta road; it was called Endidae . The sightseeing include the arcades of the old town, the parish church, the Local Culture Museum and the church of Vill.

Frazioni
The municipality of Neumarkt contains the frazioni (subdivisions, mainly villages and hamlets) Laag (Laghetti), Mazon (Mazzon), St. Florian (San Floriano) and Vill (Villa).

History

Coat-of-arms
The escutcheon is party per pale, the left side represents the argent crescent moon on a gules background; in the right side a gules cross, with shortened arms, on aa argent background. In a document dated 1395 Albrecht of Austria, brother of Duke Rudolf IV of Austria granted to the village, then called Newnmarkt, the use of the arms. The emblem was granted in 1967.

Society

Linguistic distribution
According to the 2011 census, 62.70% of the population speak German, 36.89% Italian and 0.42% Ladin as first language.

Notable people 
 Lilli Gruber (born 1957 in Neumarkt), journalist and former politician

Sport 
The ice hockey team HC Neumarkt-Egna is based in the town.

Further reading 
 Josef Fontana (1993). Neumarkt 1848–1970: ein Beitrag zur Zeitgeschichte des Unterlandes. Bozen 1993, .
 Hannes Obermair (1993). Die Urkunden des Dekanatsarchives Neumarkt (Südtirol) 1297–1841. (= Schlern-Schriften 289). Innsbruck: Wagner 1993, .
 Helmut Gritsch (1997). Neumarkt an der Etsch – Vergangenheit und Gegenwart. Hrsg. vom Verein für die Ortspflege Neumarkt, Neumarkt 1997 (online).
 Martin Lercher (2005). Die Kirchen von Neumarkt. Pluristamp, Bozen 2005.

References

External links
  Homepage of the municipality
 Neumarkt Tourist Information

Municipalities of South Tyrol